Atholl is a suburb of Johannesburg, South Africa. It is located in Region E. Atholl was the name of a former district in the Scottish Highlands, which is now part of the Perth and Kinross council area.

References

External links 
 Scottish Place Names in Johannesburg, South Africa lists suburbs with Scottish placenames.

Johannesburg Region E